The Knights of Pythias Temple is an historic Knights of Pythias building located at 2551 Elm Street in the Deep Ellum neighborhood of Dallas, Texas. Also known as the Union Bankers Building for a later owner, it was designed by African-American architect William Sidney Pittman and opened in 1916.

Construction and original use
The Knights of Pythias Temple was designed by William Sidney Pittman. The primary tenant was the state headquarters of the Grand Lodge of the Colored Knights of Pythias, and was first occupied in 1916. The building was designed for multiple purposes. There were storefronts for a barber shop and a drug store, second floor offices serving African-American physicians and other professionals, with life insurance companies and other institutions filling out the space on the third floor. The fourth floor featured a ballroom and other public space. The overall design was neoclassical, but with red brick cladding, and tall arched windows looking out from the top floor.

The Knights of Pythias Temple was the first major commercial structure in Dallas built for African-Americans, by African-Americans, and with African-American money. From 1916 to 1939 it served as the social, professional and cultural center of the center of the city's African-American community. The ballroom hosted the performing arts and lectures, with some notable appearances by the Fisk Jubilee Singers, Marcus Garvey, and George Washington Carver.

Later uses
Due to financial difficulties, the Knights of Pythias were forced to sell the temple to Ben Ackerman in 1946. In turn, a lawsuit forced Ackerman to sell the temple for $100,000 in 1956. Meanwhile, the local Pythians relocated to a second floor office facing their former temple. In 1959 the building was purchased by the Union Bankers Insurance Company, which turned it into a standard office building.

The old lettering for the Knights of Pythias still adorned the building into the early 1980s, when Union Bankers obscured the old name. Local preservationists secured an injunction to force Union Bankers to uncover the old name displayed on the facade. The city designated the site as a Dallas Landmark in 1989. Union Bankers abandoned the site in the 1990s. Though various restoration projects and redevelopment have been proposed over the last two decades, it has been unoccupied through 2017. In 2017, a consortium of developers announced a plan to redevelop the block, including a restoration of the red brick cladding of the Knights of Pythias Temple.

Gallery

References

External links
 
 

Knights of Pythias buildings
Buildings and structures in Dallas
Buildings and structures completed in 1916
Clubhouses in Texas
African-American architects
Dallas Landmarks